Niwki may refer to the following places:
Niwki, Tuchola County in Kuyavian-Pomeranian Voivodeship (north-central Poland)
Niwki, Włocławek County in Kuyavian-Pomeranian Voivodeship (north-central Poland)
Niwki, Dąbrowa County in Lesser Poland Voivodeship (south Poland)
Niwki, Nowy Targ County in Lesser Poland Voivodeship (south Poland)
Niwki, Masovian Voivodeship (east-central Poland)
Niwki, Greater Poland Voivodeship (west-central Poland)
Niwki, Silesian Voivodeship (south Poland)
Niwki, Namysłów County in Opole Voivodeship (south-west Poland)
Niwki, Opole County in Opole Voivodeship (south-west Poland)
Niwki, Strzelce County in Opole Voivodeship (south-west Poland)